Nainital (Kumaoni: Naintāl) is a city and headquarters of Nainital district of Kumaon division, Uttarakhand, India. It is the judicial capital of Uttarakhand, the High Court of the state being located there and is the headquarters of an eponymous district. It also houses the Governor of Uttarakhand, who resides in the Raj Bhavan. Nainital was the summer capital of the United Provinces.

From the tops of the higher peaks, "magnificent views can be obtained of the vast plain to the south, or of the mass of tangled ridges lying north, bound by the great snowy range which forms the central axis of the Himalayas." The hill station attracts tourists round the year.

Geography and climate

Topography 

The bed of the lake is at a depth of  near Pashandevi, the deepest point of the lake. The lake is deduced to have been formed tectonically. Balia Nala, which is the main stream feeding the lake is along a fault line and the subsequent streams align parallel to major joints and faults. 26 major drains feed the lake including the 3 perennial drains.

Nainital is surrounded by the mountains of Ayarpata, Devpata, Handibandi, Chini,, Alma, Lariya Kanta and Sher ka Danda.

Geology 
The Krol group of rocks, comprising slates, marls, sandstones, limestones and dolomites with a few small dykes intrusives, is the dominant geological formation of Nainital's surroundings, although, Nodules, laminae and stringers of phosphatic material, followed upward by the purple-green shales intercalated with muddy fine-grained sandstone and siltstone; recognised as the Tal Formation; are also prevalent. The region has a complex geological framework; the rocks are fragile and newly formed. The town is completely located in the catchment area of the Nainital lake, which has highly folded and faulted rocks due to polyphase deformation.

Landslides are a frequent occurrence in the hill slopes surrounding the lake, which are steep. The slopes are highly vulnerable to landslides and mass movement due to various geological and human factors. The first known landslip occurred in Nainital in 1866 on Alma hill, and in 1879 there was a larger one at the same spot. The greatest landslide in Nainital occurred on 18 September 1880, on the slope which rising from the north of the flats ends at Alma peak, and resulted in 151 people being buried under the debris. Another heavy landslip occurred on 17 August 1898 outside the Nainital valley.

Climate 
Nainital experiences a subtropical highland climate (Cwb) according to Köppen–Geiger climate classification system as the town's climate is influenced by the elevation. The town is a bit dry during winter and very wet during summer due to South Asian monsoon system. The lowest precipitation total occurs in November with total , while the highest precipitation total occurs in July with total . Like most places in temperate region, Nainital has relatively cool summer. The highest temperature ever recorded in Nainital was  recorded on 18 June 1972, while the lowest temperature was  recorded on 17 January 1953.

The winter season in Nainital commences by mid-November and lasts till mid-March. The temperature gradually declines from the month of November onwards and January is the coldest month. Frost and mist are common features in the months of December and January. Occasionally widespread rainfall also occurs due to western disturbance, with snow occurring on peaks higher than 2000m. The winter rainfall is sometimes associated with cyclonic activities. The temperature, however, shows an increasing trend by the end of February or the first half of March. By mid-March, there is a progressive rise in temperature, which indicates the onset of the summer season. While days get slightly warmer; the nights continue to be cool. There is a constant increase in temperature during May and early June when the highest temperature is recorded. The months of March and April are also associated with the occurrence of hailstorms, which brings a short spell of cold.

The onset of the summer in the hills is relatively earlier than the plains and is also very lengthy and humid. The mean temperature in July and August goes down and humidity rises abruptly during this season. The monsoon usually begins by mid-May when the rain strikes and continue until mid-October. Nainital, due to its proximity to the outermost high ranges of the Himalaya, receives high annual rainfall. Generally, by mid-September, the monsoon gets weakened and rain occurs generally after long intervals. With the retreat of the monsoon, the winds blow in a reverse direction. The weather during the post-monsoon months is characterized by bright skies. It is in fact a transition between the rains and the winters and with reduced rainfall, the monthly temperature records a progressive decline till mid-January.

Flora and fauna 

The trees and bushes grown in the region (lake's basin) with their botanical and common Indian names (in parenthesis) are : Quercus leucotrichophora Oak (Banj), Aesculus indica (Pangar or Horse chestnuts), Juglans regia (Akhrot or walnut), Populus ciliata (Hill Pipal, a sacred tree), Fraxinus micrantha (Ash tree or Angu), Platanus orientalis (Chinar), Rubus lasiocarpus (Hisalu), Rosa moschata (Kunj or Musk rose), Berberis asiatica (Kilmora), Cupressus torulosa (Surai or Himalayan cypress), Rhododendron arboreum (Buruns), Cedrus deodara (Deodar), Salix acmophylla  (Weeping Willow), and Pinus (Pine).

Several species of medicinal flora and horticulture plants have also been found in the lake. The Aquatic Macrophytic vegetation include Potamogeton pectinatus, Potamogeton crispus, Polygonum glabrum, Polygonum amphibium and Polygonum hydropiper (Water pepper). The fishes found in the lake are generally carps Mahseer, and the mirror carp which breed several times during one spawning season during May to September. Two species of Mahaseer fish viz., Tor tor: The red finned mahseer and the Tor putitora: The yellow finned mahseer, a food fish which grows to varying sizes from 20 to 60 cm (7.87 to 23.62 inches) are found. Three species of Hill Trout are found in the lake: the Schizothorax sinuatus, Schizothorax richardsoni and Schizothorax plagiostornus. The imported fish bred in the lake is Mirror carp or Cyprinus carpio. Gambusia affinis also called Mosquitofish has been introduced in the lake as a biocontrol measure to control Mosquito larvae.

Demographics

As of the 2011 Indian census, Nainital had a population of 41,377. Males constitute 52.3% of the population and females 47.7%, which gives the town a sex ratio of 911 women per every 1000 men, which is less than the Uttarakhand state average of 963 women per every 1000 men. The population density was 3527.45 people per square km. There were 9,329 housing units in the town at an average density of 795.31 households per square km. 9.54% of the population is under 6 years of age. In 2011, Nainital had an average literacy rate of 92.93%, higher than the Uttarakhand state average of 78.82% - around 96.09% males and 89.47% females in the town are literate.

A special Census taken in September 1880, at the height of the tourism season, returned a total population of 10,054 for the town. However, the official Census in February 1881 returned the population, then at its lowest, at 6,576. The population slightly rose in the following decade, rising to 8,455 in 1891. After dropping to 7,609 in 1901, it remained steady in the coming two decades; 10,270 in 1911 and 11,230 in 1921. The population took another drop, when the 1931 and 1941 censuses returned a population of 9,741 and 9,539 respectively, but has seen a continuous rise since then, with subsequent census reports returning a population of 12350 in 1951, 14495 in 1961, 23986 in 1971, 24835 in 1981, 29837 in 1991, 38630 in 2001, and 41377 in 2011.

Hinduism is the largest religion in Nainital, with 85.61% of residents identifying as Hindus in the 2011 Census. The town's religious profile is highly diverse, Nainital has a significant number of people from Muslim, Sikh and Christian communities. Islam is second most popular religion in town of Nainital with approximately 11.91% following it. Christianity is followed by 0.92%, Jainism by 0.01%, Sikhism by 0.75% and Buddhism by 0.77%. Approximately 0.02% of the population were either atheists or followed 'no particular religion'. Nainital in 1880 had a population of 10,054, which consisted of 6,862 Hindus, 1,748 Muslims, 1,348 Europeans, 34 Eurasians, 57 Native Christians and 5 ‘others’. Kumaonis form the major part of the town's population along with people from all over India.
A person from Nainital is called Naintālwāl in Kumaoni. Wāl is the Kumaoni term for resident.

Languages
Hindi is the official language, while Sanskrit is the additional official language of the town.
Kumaoni is the native language and is the most spoken language in the town. Hindi and English also serve as lingua franca between locals and tourists/outsiders.

Mythology
It is believed that the Naini Lake is one of the 51 Shakti Peeths, based on the story of the death of the goddess Sati. Out of grief and sorrow, Shiva carried Sati's body, reminiscing about their moments as a couple, and roamed around the universe with it. Vishnu had cut her body into 52 body parts, using his Sudarshana Chakra, which fell on Earth to become sacred sites where all the people can pay homage to the Goddess. The spot where Sati's right eye (or Nain) fell, came to be called Nain-tal or lake of the eye. The goddess Shakti is worshiped at the Naina Devi Temple, known by locals as Naini Mata Temple on the north shore of the present day lake.

History
 Early History 
Nainital has historically been a part of the Kumaon region. After the fall of Katyuri Dynasty in 10th century, Kumaon was divided into several small princely states, and the region around Nainital was under various branches of a Khasiya family. The first dynasty to achieve consolidated dominance over Kumaon after the Katyuris was the Chand dynasty, but it took many centuries and Nainital and its surroundings were one of the last areas to be absorbed. Trilok Chand had built a fort at Bhimtal in the thirteenth century, But at that time, Nainital itself was not under the Chand rule, and was situated near the western border of the Kingdom. During the reign of Udyan Chand, the western boundary of the Chand kingdom extended to the Koshi and Suyal rivers, but Ramgarh and Kota were still under the former Khasia rule. Kirat Chand, who ruled from 1488 to 1503 was finally able to establish authority over Nainital and the surrounding region. The Khasia chiefs made an attempt to regain their independence in 1560, when they enjoyed a brief moment of success under the leadership of a Khasiya of Ramgarh, but were later subdued with ruthlessness by Balo Kalyan Chand.

 Founding and the landslip of 1880 
The Kumaon Hills came under British rule after the Anglo-Nepalese War (1814–16). The hill station town of Naini Tal was founded only in 1841, with the construction of the first European house (Pilgrim Lodge) by P. Barron, a sugar trader from Shahjahanpur. In his memoir, he wrote: "It is by far the best site I have witnessed in the course of a  trek in the Himalayas."
Aashish
(Anyar-patt – in Kumaoni means – complete blackout. The reason for this nomenclature by the locals was because there were minimal sun rays due to its location and dense forests) was being gradually planted and that the favourite sites were on the undulating tract of forest land which stretched back from the head of the lake to the base of China and Deopatta (Camel's Hump). The church, St. John(1846) in the Wilderness, was one of the earliest buildings in Nainital, followed by Belvedere, Alma lodge, Ashdale Cottage(1860)..." Soon, the town became a health resort favoured by British soldiers and by colonial officials and their families trying to escape the heat of the plains. Later, the town became the summer residence of the governor of the United Provinces.

On 18 September 1880 a landslide ('the landslip of 1880') occurred at the north end of the town, burying 151 people. The first known landslide had occurred in 1866(old Victoria hotel was destroyed), and in 1869 there was a larger one at the same spot, Alma Hill, but "the great slip"'' occurred on "Saturday 18 September 1880."

This heavy fall made the whole hillside one mass of semi-fluid matter, and required little to set in motion. The motive power was a shock of a minor earthquake, which was felt on that day itself by competent observers in the Bhabar below and Nainital itself. On the site of the Slip was the Victoria Hotel and its offices, and below it was the Hindu temple of "naina devi" and the Assembly Rooms, both by the side of the lake, and Bell's shop, which was close to the temple. Initial slip started around 10 am of 18 September, taking away western wing of the Victoria Hotel and portion of the hotel's out-houses. Tragically, most of the people were not moved much further away from the spot of the morning slip. At quarter to two the major landslip occurred and within few seconds all the buildings mentioned above were destroyed and made into an unrecognizable heap of rubble and much of it was swept into the lake."

The number of dead and missing were 108 Indian and 43 Europeans, along with numerous people who narrowly escaped. (See poem by Hannah Battersby on the page Literary references to Nainital.) The Assembly Rooms and the Naina Devi Temple were destroyed in the disaster. A recreation area known as 'The Flats' was later built on the site and a new temple was erected. To prevent further disasters, storm water drains were constructed and building bylaws were made stricter.

Government and Politics

Civic Administration 
The municipal board of Nainital had its origin in 1845, when the provisions of the Act I of 1842 were sanctioned by the government in the town, which then applied to approximately two thirds of the total population.

Politics 
Nainital town is represented in the Lok Sabha, the lower house of the Indian Parliament, by a representative elected from the Nainital-Udhamsingh Nagar Constituency. Ajay Bhatt (politician), from BJP, is the current Member of Parliament from Nainital-Udhamsingh Nagar. He won the 2019 Indian general elections by 3,39,096 votes against Harish Rawat from the Congress, who was also the former chief minister of the state. Prior to the delimitation of the Loksabha Constituencies of Uttarakhand in 2008, the town was a part of the Nainital Lok Sabha constituency. Generally considered a Congress Stronghold, the Congress has registered a victory from Nainital eight times since 1951. While the BJP has won this seat three times, several other political parties have also managed three victories.

Education 

In the latter half of the 19th century a number of "European" schools for boys and girls were founded in Nainital. During the Victorian and Edwardian eras, students in these schools consisted largely of children of the British colonial officials or soldiers. The Diocesan Girls' High School, now known as All Saints' College, was established in 1869, near where the High Court of Uttarakhand stands today. By 1906, there were over half a dozen such schools, including the Diocesan Boys' School (later renamed Sherwood College) and the Philander Smith's college (later renamed Halett War School, currently Birla Vidya Mandir).

St. Joseph's College, Nainital (popularly known as SEM), a day-boarding and residential school built by Irish brothers. in 1888, celebrated its 125th anniversary in 2013. Another important school for girls, St. Mary's Convent High School, Nainital (popularly known as Ramnee), was established in 1878, and celebrated its 125th anniversary in year 2003.

Transport

Roadways

Airways
Alliance Air, Air Heritage and Deccan Charters are the three carriers, that connect the airport to Delhi, Dehradun and Pithoragarh.

Railways
The closest major railway station is Kathgodam, on the outskirts of Haldwani, which is connected with almost all major cities of the country.

Tourism

A popular hill station, Nainital has numerous tourist spots including Nainital Lake, Naina Peak 8622ft, Himalaya Darshan & Echo Zone, Hanumangarhi and Pt. G.B. Pant High Altitude Zoo, Nainital. Nainital is Kumaon's most well known hill station, and its premier tourist destination

Nainital Yacht Club

The Nainital Yacht Club, situated along the lake, is run by the Boat House Club. It is the highest yacht club in India and among the highest clubs in the world. It was founded in 1910 by the British and, till 1970, was only open to members. Today, tourists can pay for a sailing session on the yachts.

Jama Masjid

The Jama Masjid of Nainital is located in Mallital area of Nainital is a mosque which was built in 1882 during the British Era for Muslims around Nainital. Over the main entrance one can see Arabic inscriptions. The most notable feature is the mihrab where a niche shows the direction towards Mecca.

Naina Devi Temple 

Temple of Naina Devi is located at the upper end of Naini lake. This temple is dedicated to the goddess of the town Naina Devi. Its complex becomes the location of the Nanda Devi Mela festival which held every year on Nandashtami during September.

St John Wilderness Church 
 St. John in the Wilderness is one of the oldest and finest churches in Nainital. The Church is dedicated to St. John the Baptist. This Anglican Church was built in 1846 and is one of the earliest buildings erected in Nainital.

The Mall Road 
The Mall Road is a shopping area in Nainital. It has many shops, restaurants and road side sellers. Tourists can buy a souvenir and have a good food here.

Eco Cave Gardens 
Eco Cave Gardens is a cluster of naturally formed rocky caves. It is close to the Mall Road. It has 6 caves formed in the shape of animals. Tourists can visit the caves from 9.30 a.m. to 5.30 p.m. every day of the week.

Naina Peak 
Naina Peak is a sightseeing place situated at an altitude of 2611 meters. It gives a view of the Himalayas range and a birdseye view of Nainital.

Libraries

There are a number of libraries in the Nainital area. Among them are the Durga Lal Shah Municipal Public Library on the Mall, founded in 1934, the Uttarakhand Academy of Administration, Library and Documentation Center, Mallital, the ARIES Observatory Library, and the Kumaon University Library, Nainital.

Notable people

 Amitabh Bachchan, Bollywood actor. Educated at Sherwood College.
 Sonam Bajwa, Indian actress.
 Kabir Bedi, Bollywood actor. Educated at Sherwood College.
 Jim Corbett, hunter of man-eating tigers, author, conservationist and namesake of Jim Corbett National Park. Educated at St. Joseph's College and lived in Gurney House.
 Danny Denzongpa, Bollywood actor studied in Birla Vidya Mandir
 B K Goyal, cardiologist, educated at Birla Vidya Mandir
 Percy Hobart, British major general and military engineer
 Elsie Inglis, physician and social reformer
 Hastings Ismay, 1st Baron Ismay, first secretary general of NATO
 Anup Jalota, singer
 Sukirti Kandpal, TV actress
 Sudhir Kakar, renowned psychoanalyst
 Field Marshal Sam Manekshaw, Indian Army Chief of Staff during Indo-Pakistani War of 1971. Educated at Sherwood College.
 Eric Maturin, British actor
 Lalit Modi, Indian Premier League (IPL) chairman. Educated at St. Joseph's College.
 Rajendra K. Pachauri, chairman of the Intergovernmental Panel on Climate Change
 Manish Pandey, cricketer who plays for Karnataka and Bangalore
 Nirmal Pandey, Bollywood actor and singer
 Ram Kapoor, TV actor. Educated at Sherwood College.
 Govind Ballabh Pant, statesman and leader of India's independence movement, first Indian Premier of British India, the first Chief Minister of Uttar Pradesh and the third Home Minister of India
Krishna Chandra Pant, former Deputy Chairman of the Planning Commission of India. Educated at St. Joseph's College.
Hamida Saiduzzafar, ophthalmologist
 Naseeruddin Shah, Bollywood actor. Educated at St. Joseph's College.
 Major Som Nath Sharma, India's first Param Vir Chakra award winner. Educated at Sherwood College.
 Shivani, Hindi poet
 Billy Arjan Singh, Tiger conservationist of India, Educated in Nainital.
 Dalip Tahil, Bollywood actor. Educated at Sherwood College.
 Narayan Dutt Tiwari, Indian leader and politician, former Governor of Andhra Pradesh, former Chief Minister of Uttarakhand and Uttar Pradesh, and former Finance Minister of India.
 Orde Charles Wingate, British general and commander of the Chindits in Burma during World War II

Notable Hotels in Nainital

 Hotel Suman Paradise, Nainital Hotel in Nainital. Uttrakhand.

Gallery

See also
 Aryabhatta Research Institute of Observational Sciences

References

Further reading

External links

 
 

 
Cities and towns in Nainital district
Tourism in Uttarakhand
Hill stations in Uttarakhand
Articles containing potentially dated statements from 2001
All articles containing potentially dated statements